Agthe is a surname. Notable people with the surname include:

 Adam Georg von Agthe (1777–1826), Russian general
 Adolf Agthe (1863–1941), Norwegian architect
 Albrecht Agthe (1790–1873), music educator
 Karl Christian Agthe (1762–1797), German organist and composer
 Klaus Agthe (born 1930), German-American businessman and author